This is a list of events in British radio during 1968.

Events
 4 February – BBC Radio Nottingham hosts the UK's first ever radio phone-in.
 21 August – Protests are heard at tonight's BBC Proms concert by the USSR Symphony Orchestra against the Warsaw Pact invasion of Czechoslovakia.

Station debuts
31 January – BBC Radio Nottingham
14 March – BBC Radio Stoke
24 June – BBC Radio Leeds

Programme debuts
 Undated – The Living World on BBC Radio 4 (1968–Present)
 October – Helo Sut Dach Chi? presented by Hywel Gwynfryn on BBC Wales, the first Welsh-language pop radio programme

Continuing radio programmes

1940s
 Sunday Half Hour (1940–2018)
 Desert Island Discs (1942–Present)
 Family Favourites (1945–1980)
 Down Your Way (1946–1992)
 Letter from America (1946–2004)
 Woman's Hour (1946–Present)
 Twenty Questions (1947–1976)
 Any Questions? (1948–Present)
 The Dales (1948–1969)
 A Book at Bedtime (1949–Present)

1950s
 The Archers (1950–Present)
 Listen with Mother (1950–1982)
 From Our Own Correspondent (1955–Present)
 Pick of the Pops (1955–Present)
 The Clitheroe Kid (1957–1972)
 My Word! (1957–1988)
 Test Match Special (1957–Present)
 The Today Programme (1957–Present)
 The Navy Lark (1959–1977)
 Sing Something Simple (1959–2001)
 Your Hundred Best Tunes (1959–2007)

1960s
 Farming Today (1960–Present)
 In Touch (1961–Present)
 The Men from the Ministry (1962–1977)
 I'm Sorry, I'll Read That Again (1964–1973)
 Petticoat Line (1965–1979)
 The World at One (1965–Present)
 The Official Chart (1967–Present)
 Just a Minute (1967–Present)

Ending this year
 9 June – Round the Horne (1965–1968)
 11 June – The Embassy Lark (1966–1968)
 July – Billy Cotton Band Show (1949–1968)

Births
15 January – Alex Lowe, actor, comedian and voice artist
2 June – John Culshaw, comic actor and impressionist
15 June – Samira Ahmed, arts journalist and broadcaster
4 July – Ronni Ancona, comic actress and impressionist
20 July – Julian Rhind-Tutt, actor
2 October – Victoria Derbyshire, presenter
18 October – Rhod Gilbert, Welsh comedian and broadcast presenter
Sonita Alleyne, media production company executive and college principal
Chris Neill, comedy producer and performer
Approximate date – Christopher Green, comedy performer

Deaths
24 June – Tony Hancock, comedian (born 1924)

See also 
 1968 in British music
 1968 in British television
 1968 in the United Kingdom
 List of British films of 1968

References

Radio
British Radio, 1968 In
Years in British radio